The following is a list of Turkish Canadians, including both original immigrants of full or partial Turkish descent who obtained Canadian citizenship and their Canadian descendants.

Most notable Turkish Canadians have come from, or originate from, Turkey but there are also notable Canadians of Turkish origin who have immigrated from, or descend from, the other former Ottoman territories, especially Turks from the Balkans (e.g. Mesut Mert has a Turkish-Bulgarian background), the island of Cyprus (e.g. Ozay Mehmet and Anna Silk have a Turkish Cypriot background), the Levant, and North Africa (e.g. Nihal Mazloum, has a Turkish-Egyptian).

Some notable Turkish Canadians have also come to Canada from areas where there is a modern Turkish diaspora; for example, Viola Yanik has a Turkish-German background.

Academia

Yaprak Baltacioğlu, Chancellor of Carleton University
Henri Barki, social scientist 
Izak Benbasat, Professor of Information Systems and Professor of Management Information Systems at the University of British Columbia
Selim Deringil, Professor of History at Boğaziçi University 
Cigdem Eskicioglu, Professor of Engineering at the University of British Columbia
Ramazan Gençay, Professor of Economics at  University of Windsor, Carleton University, and Simon Fraser University
Feridun Hamdullahpur, President of the University of Waterloo 
Ozay Mehmet, Professor of International Affairs at Carleton University (Turkish Cypriot origin)
Tuncer Ören, Professor of Computer Science at the University of Ottawa
M. Tamer Özsu, Professor of Computer Science at University of Waterloo
Semih Tezcan, Professor of Engineering and second president of Boğaziçi University
Murat Tuncali, Professor of Mathematics at Nipissing University
Aycan Yurtsever, physicist at the Université du Québec
Ayşe Zeki, psychiatrist and the current president of the Refugee Rights Association in Northern Cyprus (Turkish Cypriot origin)

Arts and literature
Üstün Bilgen-Reinart, writer 
Alkan Chaglar, journalist (Turkish Cyptiot origin)
Aline Gubbay,  photographer, art historian and writer (Turkish mother)
Timothy Guy Kent, painter (Turkish father) 
Nil Köksal, journalist
Nihal Mazloum, artist (Turkish-Egyptian origin)
Robert Paul Weston, children's author (Turkish British father)

Cinema and television 

Ennis Esmer, actor
Onur Karaman, film director 
Arda Ocal, TV and radio broadcaster
Anna Silk, actress (British-Turkish Cypriot mother)
Ilkay Silk, actress, playwright, producer, and educator (Turkish Cypriot origin)

Fashion
Erdem Moralioğlu, fashion designer (Turkish father)

Music 
Ozan Boz, musician and producer 
Mercan Dede, composer, ney and bendir player, DJ and producer
Orhan Demir, jazz musician
Minor Empire, Turkish-Canadian progressive music group 
Kaan Güneşberk, musician, songwriter, and composer
Evren Ozdemir, rapper

Religion 
Ahmet Fuad Sahin, founder of the International Development and Relief Foundation

Sports

Melisa Ertürk, women's football player 
, taekwondo player
Erol Kahraman, ice hockey player (Turkish Cypriot origin) 
Tuğba Karademir, figure skater
Mesut Mert, football coach (Turkish-Bulgarian origin)
Viola Yanik, wrestler (Turkish-German origin)

See also 
Turkish Canadians
List of Canadians

References

Canadian
Turkish